High Victorian Gothic was an eclectic architectural style and movement during the mid-late 19th century. It is seen by architectural historians as either a sub-style of the broader Gothic Revival style, or a separate style in its own right.

Promoted and derived from the works of the architect and theorist John Ruskin, though it eventually diverged, it is sometimes referred to as Ruskinian Gothic. It is characterised by the use of polychrome (multi-colour) decoration, "use of varying texture" and Gothic details. The architectural scholar James Stevens Curl describes it thus: "Style of the somewhat harsh polychrome structures of the Gothic Revival in the 1850s and 1860s when Ruskin held sway as the arbiter of taste. Like High Gothic, it is an unsatisfactory term, as it poses the question as to what is 'Low Victorian'. 'Mid-Victorian' would, perhaps, be more useful, but precise dates and description of styles would be more so."

Among the best-known practitioners of the style were William Butterfield, Sir Gilbert Scott, G. E. Street,  and Alfred Waterhouse. Waterhouse's Victoria Building at Liverpool University, described by Sir Charles Reilly (an opponent of Victorian Gothic) as "the colour of mud and blood," was the inspiration for the term "red brick university" (as opposed to Oxbridge and the other ancient universities).

The style began appearing in the United States, particularly New York, in the early 1860s with the work of English-born architects Frederick Clarke Withers, Jacob Wrey Mould, and Americans Edward Tuckerman Potter and Peter Bonnett Wight. By 1870, the style became popular nationwide for civic, commercial, and religious architecture, though was uncommon for residential structures. It was frequently used for what became the "Old Main" of various schools and universities in the late 19th century United States. The Stick Style is sometimes considered the wooden manifestation of the High Victorian Gothic style.

Examples

United Kingdom
All Saints, Margaret Street, London. Butterfield, 1849–59
Church of St James, Baldersby, Yorkshire. Butterfield, 1856–58
Manchester Town Hall. Waterhouse, 1863–77
Albert Memorial, London. Scott, 1872
Royal Courts of Justice, London. Street, 1873–82
No.s 2-7 Arden Street, Stratford upon Avon.
The Kirna, Walkerburn, Scottish Borders, 1867

United States
Hudson River State Hospital, Poughkeepsie, New York
Jefferson Market Courthouse, New York, New York 
Memorial Hall (Harvard University), Cambridge, Massachusetts
New Haven City Hall and County Courthouse, New Haven, Connecticut
Converse House and Barn, Norwich, Connecticut
The Miller School of Albemarle, Albemarle County, Virginia (1878-1884)
Anderson Hall (Manhattan, Kansas), Kansas State University

In the United States

See also
Victorian architecture
Venetian Gothic architecture

Notes

References

 

American architectural styles
British architectural styles
Victorian architectural styles
19th-century architectural styles